Robert Hunter may refer to:

Arts
Robert Hunter (painter) (died 1780), Irish portrait painter
Robert Hunter (encyclopædist) (1823–1897), British editor of the Encyclopædic Dictionary
Robert Hunter (author) (1874–1942), American sociologist and progressive author
Bob Hunter (Los Angeles sportswriter) (1913–1993)
Robert Hunter (lyricist) (1941–2019), American lyricist, poet, songwriter, singer
Robert Hunter (journalist) (1941–2005), Canadian environmentalist and journalist, co-founder of Greenpeace
Bob Hunter (Ohio sportswriter) (fl. 1975–2010s), American columnist
Hunter (rapper) or Robert Alan Hunter (1975–2011), Australian hip hop artist

Politics
Robert Hunter (governor) (1666–1734), Lieutenant Governor of Virginia Colony, Governor of New York, New Jersey, Jamaica
Robert M. T. Hunter (1809–1887), U.S. Speaker of the House of Representatives
Robert W. Hunter (1837–1916), Virginia newspaper editor and Confederate officer
Robert Hunter (Australian politician) (1877–1960), member of the South Australian House of Assembly
Robert Dean Hunter (1928-2023), American politician from Texas
Robert E. Hunter (born 1940), U.S. Ambassador to NATO
Robert C. Hunter (born 1944), U.S. judge, North Carolina Court of Appeals
Robert N. Hunter Jr. (born 1947), U.S. judge, North Carolina Court of Appeals

Sport
Robert Hunter (footballer) (1883–1962), English footballer
Robert Hunter (golfer) (1886–1971), American golfer and Olympic gold medalist
Robbie Hunter (cyclist) (born 1977), South African cyclist

Other people
Robert Hunter (merchant) (1792–1848), British diplomat and trader in southeast Asia
Robert Hunter (civil servant) (1844–1913), British civil servant, co-founder of the National Trust
Robert Hunter, Baron Hunter of Newington (1915–1994), British physician and university administrator
Robert S. Hunter, recipient of the Navy Cross

Fictional
Robbie Hunter (Home and Away), a character on Home and Away
Bob Hunter (Desperate Housewives), a character on Desperate Housewives

Other uses
MY Steve Irwin or Robert Hunter, Sea Shepherd Conservation Society ship

Hunter, Robert